The Church of St John the Baptist in Pawlett, Somerset, England dates from the 12th century and has been designated as a Grade I listed building.

The Norman church of St John the Baptist replaced an earlier Saxon structure and the church is thought to have been a popular station on medieval pilgrimages from Watchet to Glastonbury. The south doorway arch features three bands of decoration: lozenges, zigzags, and a biting beasts motif on the outer ring. The baptismal font appears to be made from two separate fonts, the bottom part an inverted Saxon font topped with an upright plain Norman font.

The rood screen is 15th-century. The 20th-century north window shows Christ blessing children who are in modern dress and holding a teddy bear and toy boat. Other unusual features include pew boxes that still retain hat pegs, reflecting a time when congregants wore hats to church. The chancel includes wide communion rails on three sides, thought to have been used for seated communion. Unusual and ancient features of the church in part owe their preservation to major renovations made in 1779. That "modernization" seems to have slaked the zeal for Victorian-era updates which eliminated such features in many other churches in the area. The crumbling of the church's blue lias stone led to its exterior being coated with cement.

See also

 List of Grade I listed buildings in Sedgemoor
 List of towers in Somerset
 List of ecclesiastical parishes in the Diocese of Bath and Wells

References

Church of England church buildings in Sedgemoor
Grade I listed churches in Somerset
Grade I listed buildings in Sedgemoor
12th-century church buildings in England